Le Péril jeune or The Good Old Daze is a 1994 French coming of age comedy-drama  directed by Cédric Klapisch. The movie takes place in Paris during the 1970s.

Plot 

Ten years after having left high school, four friends, Momo, Léon, Alain and Bruno meet for the birth of the child of their friend Tomasi, who recently died. Together they dwell on their mutual memories concerning their last year at their Parisian high school during the seventies. This includes demonstrations, first experiments with drugs and women and also the contents of the courses.

Cast
 Romain Duris as Tomasi
 A rebellious, hedonistic teenager. When Barbara's friends introduce him to drugs, he quickly turns into a self-destructive truant who hangs around most of his time in Barbara's squat. Still he hits on Sophie and befathers her with a child before he dies of a drug overdose.
Julien Lambroschini as Bruno  
Tomasi's best friend, and the most artistically talented of the group. He falls in love with Barbara and leads his friends into the squat where she lives with addicts. Due to this, and because he believes he could have saved Tomasi if only he had been a better friend, Bruno blames himself for Tomasi's death.
Joachim Lombard as Léon Rouvel
The most politically conscious of the group and the brother of a high school dean. Their relationship is tense, especially because his brother was involved in the May 1968 events and accuses Léon's friends of just parroting catchphrases. (Only late Léon will admit he never understood what class struggle is actually about). As a Class President Léon is often torn between his friends and his responsibilities. He has a huge crush on fellow class president Christine (Hélène de Fougerolles), but doesn't dare to act upon it because her preppiness is the target of her friends' ridicule. That he will regret he later on.
Nicolas Koretzky as Maurice 'Momo' Zareba
The son of a deaf-mute baker, with whom he has a strained relationship. While his father takes it for guaranteed that his son will become a baker too, Momo feels guilty for having other plans.
Vincent Elbaz as Alain Chabert
A reckless teenager who concentrates on sports and parties. He is somewhat of a class clown, often irritating his friends who consider him immature. Within the group, Chabert is the only one who seems to retain his integrity throughout the movie.
Lisa Faulkner as Barbara
A British student who came to France as an assistant English teacher. She dwells in a squat with a bunch of hippies, who indulge in heavy drug use (particularly LSD). She falls for Bruno  but their relationship dissolves when she heads back to England.
Julie-Anne Roth as Marie
a friend of the boys' who is committed to feminism. Yet she implies once being sexually harassed was flattering after all. She is very politically conscious, making their friends believe she and Léon will eventually become a couple. Léon later explains that this very expectation kept them from ever dating.
 Hélène de Fougerolles as Christine
 Élodie Bouchez as Sophie
 Caroline Damiens as Nora
 Coco Bouiller as Félicité
 Eric Andreini as Thierry
 Jackie Berroyer as Jo
 Caroline Proust as Squat girl

References

External links
 
 
 

1994 films
Films directed by Cédric Klapisch
Films set in the 1970s
Films set in Paris
French comedy-drama films
1990s French-language films
1990s French films